Maximus V (26 October 1897 – 1 January 1972) was an Orthodox Christian bishop. He was Ecumenical Patriarch of Constantinople from 1946 until 1948.

Biography
He was born Maximos Vaportzis in northern Turkey, at Sinop in Kastamonu Vilayet, on the Black Sea coast. He was first educated, under the protection of metropolitan bishop Germanos of Amaseia, at the Theological School of Halki, Istanbul.

In 1918, he was ordained a deacon. With this appointment, he also became teacher at the city school of Theira. He served as arch-deacon under Metropolitans Gregorios of Chalcedon and Joachim of Ephesus. In 1920, he became the archdeacon to the Ecumenical Patriarchate itself.

In 1946, he became Patriarch of Constantinople. He was known for his 'leftist' opinions and ties with the Moscow Patriarchate. He resigned in 1948, officially because of poor health; unofficially because western powers did not approve his ties with the Soviet-controlled Patriarch of Moscow. He was succeeded by the archbishop of America, Athenagoras, and was given the title of Ephesus.

He died in Switzerland on January 1, 1972.

External links
His All Hollines Ecumenical Patriarch Maximus of Constantinople

1897 births
1972 deaths
People from Sinop, Turkey
People from Kastamonu vilayet
Pontic Greeks
20th-century Ecumenical Patriarchs of Constantinople
Theological School of Halki alumni
Bishops of Chalcedon